The Roman Catholic Archdiocese of Gorizia is an archdiocese of the Latin Church of the Catholic Church in Italy. The archiepiscopal see of Gorizia (Friulian: Gurizza/Gurizze;) was founded in 1751 when the Patriarchate of Aquileia was divided. It was suppressed in 1788 for the creation of the Diocese of Gradisca (union of the Archdiocese of Gorizia and Dioceses of Trieste and Pedena) and re-established in 1791 as the Diocese of Görz-Gradisca. It was raised again to an archdiocese in 1830. The diocese of Ljubljana (Laibach), Trieste-Koper (Capo d'Istria), Poreč-Pula (Parenzo-Pola), and Krk-Rab (Veglia-Arbe) were formerly under the metropolitan jurisdiction of this archdiocese; however, now the Diocese of Trieste is its only suffragan diocese.

The territory of the Archdiocese was identical with the Austro-Hungarian County of Gorizia and Gradisca until 1918 when it was transferred to Italy at the conclusion of the First World War. Also from 1766, the archbishop was Prince of the Holy Roman Empire and member of the Austrian House of Lords until 1918.

Ordinaries

Prince-archbishops of Gorizia
 Karl Michael von Attems (1752–1774)
 Rudolf Joseph von Edling (1774–1784)
vacant. Abolished in 1788 and restored as a diocese in 1791.

Bishops of Görz-Gradisca
 Franz Philipp von Inzaghi (1791-1816)
 Joseph Walland (1818-1830)

Archbishops of Gorizia
 Joseph Walland (1830–1835)
 Franz Xaver Luschin (1835–1854)
 Andreas Gollmayr (1855–1883)
 Alojzij Zorn (1883–1897)
 Jakob Missia (1897–1902)
 Andrej Jordan (1902–1905)
 Frančišek Borgia Sedej (1906–1931)

vacant

 Carlo Margotti (1934–1951)
 Giacinto Giovanni Ambrosi (1951–1962)
 Andrea Pangrazio (1962–1967)
 Pietro Cocolin (1967–1982) 
 Antonio Vitale Bommarco (1982–1999) 
 Dino De Antoni (1999–2012)
 Carlo Roberto Maria Redaelli (2012–present); previously, Vicar General and Auxiliary Bishop of the Roman Catholic Archdiocese of Milan

See also
 Archbishop of Udine
 List of bishops and patriarchs of Aquileia
 Patriarch of Venice

References

Religious organizations established in 1751
Gorizia
Gorizia
Roman Catholic Archdiocese
1751 establishments in the Holy Roman Empire